Foghat is the second album, and the second self-titled album, by the English rock band Foghat, released in March 1973. It is generally known by fans as Rock 'n' Roll, because of its cover picture depicting a rock and bread roll.

Track listing
"Ride, Ride, Ride" (Dave Peverett, Rod Price) – 4:24
"I Feel So Bad" (Chuck Willis) – 5:09
"Long Way to Go" (Peverett, Price, Tony Stevens, Roger Earl) – 5:07
"It's Too Late" (Peverett, Price) – 5:45
"What a Shame" (Price) – 3:52
"Helpin' Hand" (Peverett, Price, Stevens, Earl) – 4:41
"Road Fever" (Peverett, Price) – 4:23
"She's Gone" (Peverett, Price) – 3:12
"Couldn't Make Her Stay" (Peverett) – 1:57

Personnel
Dave Peverett – vocals, rhythm guitar
Rod Price – lead and slide guitars
Tony Stevens – bass
Roger Earl – drums

Charts

References

1973 albums
Foghat albums
Bearsville Records albums
Rhino Records albums